Adrian Paul Winkel (April 19, 1915 – November 29, 1994) was an American politician and High Commissioner of the Trust Territory of the Pacific Islands.

Born in Breckenridge, Minnesota, Winkel graduated from Saint John's University in Minnesota. He then taught high school in Minnesota and Wisconsin. He worked with the Minnesota Commissioner of Taxation, the public works department of Saint Paul, Minnesota and the United States Post Office. Winkel also served as an administrative assistant to Congressmen Eugene McCarthy and Philip Burton. He was also chairman of the Minnesota Democratic Farmer-Labor Party. He served as High Commissioner of the Trust Territory of the Pacific Islands 1977–1981.

Notes

1915 births
1994 deaths
People from Breckenridge, Minnesota
Minnesota Democrats
High Commissioners of the Trust Territory of the Pacific Islands
College of Saint Benedict and Saint John's University alumni